Andreas Ziartides (1919–1997) was a Cypriot trade unionist and politician.

He was a Member of Parliament from 1960 to 1991, being elected as a candidate of the left wing AKEL party.

He was Secretary General of the Pancyprian Federation of Labour (PEO) from 1943 to 1986. His contribution to the development of labour relations and labour legislation in Cyprus has been crucial and many consider him the person with the most significant role in shaping the trade union movement on the island.  Legislations such as the Social Security Law of Cyprus in 1956 (Πρώτος Νόμος Περί Κοινωνικών Ασφαλίσεων, Νόμος Αρ. 31 του 1956), the introduction of the Cost of Living Allowance, the eight-hour working day and the forty hour working week, legislation on unfair dismissal and the labour disputes tribunals, the shaping of the collective agreements in many sectors of economic activity as well as the tripartite cooperation between trade unions, employers’ organisations and government all bear his mark.

He first joined the outlawed Communist Party of Cyprus in 1939 and became a member of left wing AKEL party in 1941 upon its foundation.
He was Secretary General of the Pancyprian Trade Union Committee, the first coordinating body of trade unions in Cyprus and the precursor of PEO.  He was accused along with all the Committee members for sedition and insurrection against the Colonial order and sentenced to 18 months imprisonment in 1946.  This was a major political trial of the colonial era and his address to the court was a memorable anti-colonial statement.

Andreas Ziartides participated as the Cypriot representative in the founding congress of the World Federation of Trade Unions (WFTU) held in 1945 in London.  He served on the General Council and the Executive Committee of the WFTU for many years and was its Vice President for a while.

In the early nineties he, along with others in the AKEL leadership, disagreed with the line followed by the Party and was dismissed from his leadership position. ADESOK was later merged with Free Democrats Movement (founded by former President of Cyprus George Vassiliou) and formed a new party named United Democrats.

A form of interview/biography of Andreas Ziartides was authored by Panikos Paionides in his book "Ανδρέας Ζιαρτίδης: Χωρίς φόβο και πάθος" 

Television interviews of Andreas Ziartides were documented by journalist Pavlos Pavlou in his book Dimosia Katathesi. One of the television interviews given to journalist Spyros Kettiros (12 January 1994) in his TV programme "En Lefko" ("Εν Λευκώ"), is available from the CyBC archive Digital Herodotus.

References

1919 births
1997 deaths
People from Nicosia
Progressive Party of Working People politicians
United Democrats politicians